Stepfather is the fifth album by the People Under the Stairs. The album signified a departure from the group's previous, Golden age hip hop sound, and the album introduced a more widely varied array of sample sources. The album also spawned two singles, "Tuxedo Rap" and "Pass The 40".

Distribution of the album was handled in the United States by the local Los Angeles label Basement Records, and the release overseas was handled by Tres Records, a label co-founded by Thes One with Chikara Kurahashi from Giant Panda.

Background
After the release of the People Under the Stairs' previous record, ...Or Stay Tuned and another world tour, Thes One and Double K found themselves free of their record contract with Om Records, and as a result, the group felt more personally responsible for the direction of their music. They also took some time to record side projects, and Thes One married his longtime girlfriend. The group started to move away from the "party life" they had enjoyed while making the previous albums, and the musical and lyrical themes that would be present on their next record reflected that growth.

Recording
When they began work on the new album in 2005, Thes One and Double K were feeling that sample-based hip hop was becoming repetitive and gravitating increasingly toward overused jazz samples. They even went so far as to feel critical of the success of their final Om releases, O.S.T. and ...Or Stay Tuned. The group was also unhappy with the rise in internet music piracy and the drive by music companies to push artists toward "hot singles" and away from themed albums. Due to all these factors, People Under the Stairs made a conscious decision to be as different and unique as possible in their attempt to create a cohesive album with a broader, less jazzy sound palette. They felt they had to step away from what they perceived as a stale hip hop scene as it existed in Los Angeles.

Determined to make their new album all about the new musical direction they were taking, Thes One and Double K released Stepfather with an extremely toned-down, minimalist album cover by Thes One's long time friend, Joshua Dunn of the design team Secret Pizza Party (who later became an editor for Wax Poetics). The cover was meant to look like a "working copy" record sleeve, with just the group's name in Umbra font and two fireworks prints, as well as the album's name and a phone number.

People Under the Stairs invited keyboardist Kat Ouano of the Oakland-based Crown City Rockers to play on the album-closing track, "On & On". Her bandmate, Headnodic, had played on People Under the Stairs' third album, O.S.T., and both musicians have since been invited back several times on subsequent releases.

Double K, a lifelong fan of the P-Funk collective, also invited George Clinton to be a part of the album, and Clinton agreed. He appears on the track "The Doctor and the Kidd".

While record digging at a flea market in Mexico City in 2005, Thes One came across a copy of the EP, Matt the Cat, by Matthew Cassell, a musician who recorded a small body of material during the late 1970s. Thes One was instantly drawn to the record, and believing it to be a Mexican album, he included a sample of "All I'm Missing is You" by Cassell on the People Under the Stairs track "You". When Cassell discovered that Thes One (and other DJs) had re-discovered his music, he requested that his name be included in the writing credits for the tracks on which he was sampled, including "You".

Fake leak
Stepfather was released during the peer-to-peer file sharing explosion, and subsequently, many unauthorized demos and bootlegs of forthcoming albums were finding their way into the hands of fans before the artists could release finalized albums. As a precautionary measure, Thes One and Double K recorded a "fake album" (also titled Stepfather), and intentionally leaked the fake album (with the help of the People Under the Stairs online message board) onto the internet on February 21, 2006.

The leak consisted of several tracks of Thes One reciting The Rime of the Ancient Mariner, sandwiched between introductory and concluding tracks which ridiculed the listener for being too eager to get the album.

The fake leak (along with three bonus tracks) was later released as a promotional CD called Redheaded Stepfather: The Fake Leak in collaboration with the online retailer HipHopSite.com and given away with pre-orders of the album.

Reception and touring
Stepfather debuted at #32 on the Billboard Heatseaker Chart and #35 on the Billboard Independent Albums chart. Allmusic, in a positive review, stated that the album "successfully combines rhymes, beats, groove, and flow into one really coherent, 20-song record" and called the group "experienced leaders who've made their mark in the music". Upon release of the album, Tiny Mix Tapes reviewer Alan Ranta also called the group "movement leaders" of "culturally positive hip-hop" and called the album "the type of music that saves lives and makes good days great".

At initial in-store concerts in support of the album, Thes One and Double K noticed that the average age of the people coming out to support them was much younger than they were expecting. Excited that they were reaching a new generation of hip hop fans, the group asked for their United States tour dates to be "all ages" shows and in-store appearances at record shops in an effort to reach out to the new young audience.

They toured the US through Spring 2006, taking along the then-unknown rock-rap group Gym Class Heroes as their opening act. In the Summer and Fall of 2006, the group embarked on another world tour, visiting Australia, New Zealand, Japan and Europe. For the Europe leg of the tour, they were accompanied by Giant Panda. In 2007, the group made additional visits to the UK and the Western United States.

Track listing
All songs written by Christopher "Thes One" Portugal and Michael "Double K" Turner, except where noted.

The compact disc version of the album was also released with a bonus DVD, which included:
several short videos about the group and creating the album
"Ice Castle 2001" (a short film)
two music videos for Thes One's Bloquera side project
a music video for Double K's side project Tha Brothaload
 a hidden easter egg of Thes One as a contestant on The Price Is Right

References

External links
Official People Under The Stairs Website
Official Stepfather lyrics page on The Point of the Rhyme

People Under the Stairs albums
2006 albums